The Shiliin Bogd (Mongolian: Шилийн богд) is an extinct volcano in eastern Mongolia. The Shiliin Bogd 70 kilometer away from Altan Ovoo which in the center of Dariganga soum. Shiliin or Shil means there is less water thus there are fewer herders live in this area. The Shiliin Bogd is one of most visited place for Mongolians especially for men for their belief.

References

External links 
 Shiliin Bogd Nature Reserve

Mountains of Mongolia
Sükhbaatar Province
Volcanoes of Mongolia